Kene Ekwunife (born January 5, 1993), better known by his stage names Kami (sometimes stylized as KAMI) and Kami de Chukwu, is an American rapper from Chicago, Illinois. He is one half of Leather Corduroys. He is one of the founding members of Savemoney. He was included on RedEyes "5 Chicago acts to watch in 2017" list, as well as Facts "10 rappers to watch in 2018" list.

Career
In 2012, Kami released his debut mixtape, Light. In 2017, he released Just Like the Movies, which featured guest appearances from Vic Mensa, Towkio, and Joey Purp. It was described by Noisey as "the fascinating extension of rap's current druggy, emotive melodicism into the more extreme sonic possibilities". In that year, he also released an EP, Superstar. In 2018, he released an EP, From Me to You, as well as a collaborative EP with Smoko Ono, titled Very Slight.

Leather Corduroys has released two projects together: Porno Music Vol. 2 (2014) and Season (2015). Season received a 6.8 rating from Pitchfork.

Discography

Albums
 Just Like the Movies (2017)

Mixtapes
 Light (2012)

EPs
 Superstar (2017)
 From Me to You (2018)
 Very Slight (2018)

Singles
 "Home Movies" (2016)
 "Foundation" (2016)
 "Right Now" (2016)
 "Scene Girl" (2017)
 "Reboot" (2018)

References

External links
 

Living people
1993 births
Rappers from Chicago
21st-century American rappers